Bertel Flaten (31 January 1900 – 15 January 1963) was a Norwegian politician for the Liberal Party.

He served as a deputy representative to the Norwegian Parliament from Sogn og Fjordane during the terms 1954–1957 and 1958–1961.

References

1900 births
1963 deaths
Liberal Party (Norway) politicians
Deputy members of the Storting
Sogn og Fjordane politicians